The 2017 All-Ireland Senior Football Championship was the 130th edition of the GAA's premier inter-county Gaelic football tournament since its establishment in 1887.

Thirty-three teams took part – thirty-one of the thirty-two Counties of Ireland (Kilkenny, as in previous years, do not enter), London and New York.

Dublin won their third championship in a row, defeating Mayo in the final on 17 September 2017 by 1–17 to 1–16.

Format

Provincial Championships format
Connacht, Leinster, Munster and Ulster each organise a provincial championship. All teams who lose a match in their provincial championship (with the exception of New York) enter the All-Ireland qualifiers. All provincial matches are knock-out.

Qualifiers format
Twenty eight of the twenty nine teams beaten in the provincial championships enter the All-Ireland qualifiers, which are knockout. Sixteen of the seventeen teams (New York do not enter the qualifiers) eliminated before their provincial semi-finals play eight matches in round 1, with the winners of these games playing the eight beaten provincial semi-finalists in round 2. The eight winning teams from round 2 play-off against each other in round 3, with the four winning teams facing the four beaten provincial finalists in round 4 to complete the double-elimination format. Further details of the format are included with each qualifier round listed below.

All-Ireland format
The four provincial champions play the four winners of round 4 of the qualifiers in the quarter-finals. Two semi-finals and a final follow. All matches are knock-out. If a game ends in a draw it is replayed. If a replay ends in a draw, two ten minute periods of extra time are played each way. If extra time ends in a draw, the match is replayed for a third time.

Changes from 2016
On 1 January 2017 the 'mark' was introduced. It is defined as -

When a player catches the ball cleanly from a kick-out without it touching the ground, on or past the 45 metre line nearest the kick out point, he shall be awarded a ‘mark’ by the referee. The player awarded a ‘mark’ shall have the options of (a) taking a free kick or (b) playing on immediately.

Provincial championships

Leinster Senior Football Championship

The four teams who won the quarter-finals in the previous year are given byes to this year's quarter-finals.

Munster Senior Football Championship

The two teams who won the semi-finals in the previous year are given byes to this year's semi-finals.

The Munster championship differed from the other provincial championships with regard to which teams were designated A or B in the qualifiers -
 the loser of Limerick v Clare went into the B qualifiers, while the loser of Cork v Waterford went into the A qualifiers
 the winner of Limerick v Clare joined Kerry on the A side of the draw, while the winner of Cork v Waterford joined Tipperary on the B side of the draw

Ulster Senior Football Championship

An un-seeded draw determines the fixtures for all nine teams.

Connacht Senior Football Championship

All-Ireland Series

Qualifiers

A and B teams
An A and B system for the qualifier draws was introduced in 2014 and was retained. The teams were designated as A or B depending on which half of their provincial championships they played in. Although some teams receive byes in the early provincial rounds, their position in the round in which they entered the competition was usually determined by the provincial draw, resulting in most teams being designated as A or B randomly. For example, each of the four provinces had two semi-finals – one between two teams designated A and one between two teams designated B – and the beaten semi-finalists in each province were always one A team and one B team.

In all qualifier rounds A teams played A teams and B teams played B teams. Usually the A teams played their provincial games before the B teams, which allowed the A qualifier games to be scheduled a week before the B qualifier games. The A and B system attempted to ensure that teams beaten in the provincial championships had a least two weeks before playing their subsequent qualifier match, though this was not always possible.

Round 1
In the first round of the qualifiers sixteen of the seventeen teams beaten in the preliminary rounds or quarter-finals of the provincial championships competed. New York did not enter the qualifiers. Four A teams played four A teams and four B teams played four B teams. The round 1 draw was unrestricted − if two teams had played each other in a provincial match they could be drawn to meet again, with the winner of the provincial match receiving home advantage. The eight round 1 winners played the eight beaten provincial semi-finalists in round 2 of the qualifiers.

The following teams took part in round 1;

 

 Sligo 
 London   
 Laois  Longford  Louth  Wicklow  Carlow  Offaly  Wexford  
 Waterford  Limerick  

 

 Antrim   Derry  
 Armagh 
 Cavan 
 Fermanagh

Round 2
In the second round of the qualifiers the eight winning teams from Round 1A and Round 1B played the eight beaten provincial semi-finalists. The round 2 draw was unrestricted − if two teams had played each other in a provincial match they could be drawn to meet again, with the winner of the provincial match receiving home advantage. The eight winners of these matches played each other in Round 3.

The following teams took part in round 2;

 Derry

 Laois

 Longford

 Sligo

 Clare

 Donegal

 Mayo

 Meath

 Armagh

 Carlow

 Cavan

 Wexford

 Leitrim

 Monaghan

 Tipperary

 Westmeath

Round 3
In the third round of the qualifiers winning teams from round 2A  played against winning teams from round 2A, while winning teams from round 2B played against winning teams from round 2B. Round 3 draw rules did not allow two teams that had played each other in a provincial match to meet again if such a pairing could be avoided. The four winners of these matches played the four beaten provincial finalists in round 4.

The following teams took part in round 3;

 Clare

 Donegal

 Mayo

 Meath

 Armagh

 Carlow

 Monaghan

 Tipperary

Round 4
In the fourth round of the qualifiers, the four winning teams from round 3 played the four beaten provincial finalists. Round 4 draw rules did not allow two teams that had played each other in a provincial match to meet again if such a pairing could be avoided. The matches were normally held in neutral venues. The four winners of these matches played the provincial champions in the All-Ireland quarter-finals.

The following teams took part in round 4;

 Donegal

 Mayo

 Cork

 Galway

 Armagh

 Monaghan

 Down

 Kildare

 Galway had beaten Mayo in the Connacht semi-final. In order to avoid a repeat pairing of Galway and Mayo, the round 4A fixtures of Galway v Donegal and Mayo v Cork were arranged without the need for a draw.
 Down had beaten both Armagh and Monaghan in the Ulster championship meaning that a repeat pairing was unavoidable in round 4B. A draw held on Monday 17 July 2017 determined that Down would meet Monaghan again.

Quarter-finals
The four provincial champions played the four winners from round 4 of the qualifiers. Draw rules 1) Two teams who met in a provincial final could not meet again 2) If one of the provincial champions had already met one of the qualifiers in an earlier match then those two teams could not be drawn together if such a pairing could be avoided.

This was the final year of the knock-out quarter-finals which began with the introduction of the All-Ireland qualifiers in 2001. Following a vote at the GAA congress on Saturday 25 February 2017, the last eight teams in 2018 competed in two groups of four with the winners and runners-up in each group progressing to the semi-finals.

Semi-finals
There was no draw for the semi-finals as the fixtures were pre-determined on a three yearly rotation. This rotation ensured that a provinces champions played the champions of the other three provinces once every three years in the semi-finals if they each won their quarter-finals and prevented the champions from the same two provinces meeting in the semi-finals in successive years. If a qualifier team were to defeat a provincial winner in a quarter-final, the qualifier team would take that provincial winner's place in the semi-final.

Final

Championship statistics
All scores correct as of 21 September 2017

Top scorer: overall

Top scorer: from play

Top scorer: single game

Scoring events
Widest winning margin: 31
 Dublin 4-29 – 0-10 Westmeath (Leinster SFC semi-final)
Most goals in a match: 5
Wicklow 3-10 – 2-16 Laois (All-Ireland SFC Qualifiers 1A)
Most points in a 70-minute match: 40
 Dublin 2-23 – 1-17 Kildare (Leinster SFC final)
 Monaghan 1-24 – 1-16 Down (All-Ireland SFC Qualifiers 4B)
Most points in a match (including extra-time): 47
 Mayo 0-27 – 2-20 Cork (All-Ireland SFC Qualifiers 4A)
Most goals by one team in a match: 4
Laois 4-15 – 0-16 Longford (Leinster SFC quarter-final)
 Dublin 4-29 – 0-10 Westmeath (Leinster SFC semi-final)
 Galway 4-17 – 0-14 Donegal (All-Ireland SFC Qualifiers 4A)
 Mayo 4-19 – 0-9 Roscommon (All-Ireland SFC quarter-final replay)
Most goals by a losing team: 3
Meath 0-27 – 3-9 Louth (Leinster SFC quarter-final)
Wicklow 3-10 – 2-16 Laois (All-Ireland SFC Qualifiers 1A)
Sligo 0-22 – 3-7 Antrim (All-Ireland SFC Qualifiers 1A)
 Highest aggregate score in a 70-minute match: 51 points
 Dublin 4-29 – 0-10 Westmeath (Leinster SFC semi-final)
 Highest aggregate score in a match (including extra-time): 53 points
 Mayo 0-27 – 2-20 Cork (All-Ireland SFC Qualifiers 4A)
Lowest aggregate score: 19 points
Donegal 0-12 – 0-7 Longford (All-Ireland SFC Qualifiers 2A)

Miscellaneous
The Dublin-Carlow game was the first championship meeting between the sides since 1988.
 Down beat Armagh for the first time since 1992.
 Kerry won their 5th Munster title in a row for the first time since winning 8 in a row (1975–1982).
 Dublin become the first county to win 7 Leinster titles in a row.
 Mayo defeated Kerry for the first time in 21 years and only their second time in 66 years.
First-time championship meetings:
Waterford vs Derry (Qualifiers Round 1A)
Sligo vs Antrim (Qualifiers Round 1A)
London vs Carlow (Qualifiers Round 1B)
Meath vs Sligo (Qualifiers Round 2A)
Westmeath vs Armagh (Qualifiers Round 2B)
Carlow vs Leitrim (Qualifiers Round 2B)
Clare vs Mayo (Qualifiers Round 3A)
Carlow vs Monaghan (Qualifiers Round 3B)
Tipperary vs Armagh (Qualifiers Round 3B)
Kildare vs Armagh (Qualifiers Round 4B)
 Dublin are the first county since Kerry (1984–1986) to win 3 All Ireland Championships in a row.
Carlow won three championship games for the first time since 1944.

Referees Panel
As announced in May 2017:
 Ciaran Branagan (Down)
 Barry Cassidy (Derry)
 David Coldrick (Meath)
 Niall Cullen (Fermanagh), first year
 Maurice Deegan (Laois)
 Marty Duffy (Sligo)
 David Gough (Meath)
 Jerome Henry (Mayo), first year
 Rory Hickey (Clare)
 Pádraig Hughes (Armagh)
 Sean Hurson (Tyrone)
 Fergal Kelly (Longford)
 Conor Lane (Cork)
 Joe McQuillan (Cavan)
 Noel Mooney (Cavan)
 Paddy Neilan (Roscommon)
 Anthony Nolan (Wicklow)
 Derek O'Mahoney (Tipperary)
 Padraig O'Sullivan (Kerry)
 Cormac Reilly (Meath)

Cormac Reilly (Meath) returned after missing 2016, while Eddie Kinsella (Laois) retired at the end of 2016.

Linesman Panel
 James Bermingham (Cork)
 Brendan Cawley (Kildare)
 Liam Devenney (Mayo)
 Paul Faloon (Down)
 John Hickey (Carlow)
 Shaun McLaughlin (Donegal)
 Martin McNally (Monaghan)
 James Molloy (Galway)

Broadcast rights
Matches were broadcast live on television in Ireland on RTÉ and Sky Sports under a new five-year contract that was agreed in December 2016.
In the United Kingdom, matches were shown on Sky Sports and worldwide coverage was provided on GAAGO. RTÉ Radio 1 also had full radio rights to all championship games which were previously shared with Newstalk.

RTÉ coverage was shown on RTÉ Two on The Sunday Game Live presented by Michael Lyster in high definition. Des Cahill presented The Sunday Game highlights and analysis show on Sunday evening.

Live TV coverage
RTÉ, the national broadcaster in Ireland, provide the majority of the live television coverage of the football championship in the first year of a five-year deal running from 2017 until 2021. Sky Sports also broadcast a number of matches and have exclusive rights to some games including two All-Ireland football quarter-finals. BBC Northern Ireland broadcast all games from the Ulster Championship which are shown live on RTÉ, with full deferred coverage later in the evening of those games not shown live.

Awards

The Sunday Game Team of the Year
The Sunday Game team of the year was picked on 17 September, the night of the final. Dublin's James McCarthy was named as The Sunday Game player of the year.

 Stephen Cluxton (Dublin)
 Mick Fitzsimons (Dublin)
 Chris Barrett (Mayo)
 Keith Higgins (Mayo)
 Colm Boyle (Mayo)
 Cian O'Sullivan (Dublin)
 Jack McCaffrey (Dublin)
 Tom Parsons (Mayo)
 James McCarthy (Dublin)
 Kevin McLoughlin (Mayo)
 Aidan O'Shea (Mayo)
 Con O'Callaghan (Dublin)
 Paul Mannion (Dublin)
 Paul Geaney (Kerry)
 Andy Moran (Mayo)

All Star Team of the Year
Nominations were revealed on 21 September 2017. The football All Stars were revealed on 3 November 2017. Andy Moran was announced as player of the year and Con O'Callaghan as young player of the year.
 David Clarke
 Chris Barrett
 Michael Fitzsimmons
 Keith Higgins
 Colm Boyle
 Cian O'Sullivan
 Jack McCaffrey
 Colm Cavanagh
 James McCarthy
 Dean Rock
 Aidan O'Shea
 Ciaran Kilkenny
 Paul Mannion
 Paul Geaney
 Andy Moran

Nominated Players

GOALKEEPERS

Stephen Cluxton (Dublin), David Clarke (Mayo), Niall Morgan (Tyrone)

DEFENDERS

Jack McCaffrey, Cian O’Sullivan, Michael Fitzsimons, Philip McMahon, John Small, Jonny Cooper (Dublin), Keith Higgins, Lee Keegan, Chris Barrett, Colm Boyle, Brendan Harrison (Mayo), Pádraig Hampsey, Tiernan McCann (Tyrone), Paul Murphy, Tadhg Morley (Kerry), Conor Devanney (Roscommon), Caolan Mooney (Down), Fintan Kelly (Monaghan).

MIDFIELDERS

James McCarthy, Brian Fenton (Dublin), Tom Parsons (Mayo), Colm Cavanagh (Tyrone), Enda Smith (Roscommon), Kevin Feely (Kildare).

FORWARDS

Andy Moran, Kevin McLoughlin, Aidan O’Shea, Jason Doherty, Cillian O’Connor (Mayo), Ciarán Kilkenny, Con O’Callaghan, Paul Mannion, Dean Rock (Dublin), Paul Geaney, Kieran Donaghy, James O’Donoghue (Kerry), Peter Harte, Niall Sludden (Tyrone), Connaire Harrison (Down), Patrick McBrearty (Donegal), Jamie Clarke (Armagh), Daniel Fly

Stadia and locations
Each team has a nominal home stadium, though not all teams are guaranteed a home game over the course of the Championship. In addition, games may be played at a neutral or alternate venue. For example, Dublin have not played a Championship game in Parnell Park, their nominal home, since the 2004 Championship.

References